Quarters stop is a tram stop under construction in the Edmonton Light Rail Transit network in Edmonton, Alberta, Canada. It will serve the Valley Line, and is located on the south side 102 Avenue, west of 96 Street, in Boyle Street. The stop was scheduled to open in 2020; however, as of December 2022 the  Valley Line had not opened and no definite opening date had been announced.

Around the station
The Quarters, also known as Boyle Street
Chinatown and Little Italy
Edmonton Chinatown Multicultural Centre 
Hyatt Place Edmonton/Downtown

References

External links
TransEd Valley Line LRT

Edmonton Light Rail Transit stations
Railway stations under construction in Canada
Valley Line (Edmonton)